Pantherophis emoryi, commonly known as the Great Plains rat snake, is a species of nonvenomous rat snake in the family Colubridae. The species is native to the central part of the United States, from Missouri to Nebraska, to Colorado, south to Texas, and into northern Mexico.

Etymology
The epithet, emoryi, is in honor of Brigadier General William Hemsley Emory, who was chief surveyor of the U.S. Boundary Survey team of 1852 and collected specimens for the Smithsonian Institution. As such, it is sometimes referred to as Emory's rat snake.

Common names
Additional common names for Pantherophis emoryi include the following: brown rat snake, chicken snake, eastern spotted snake, Emory's Coluber, Emory's pilot snake, Emory's racer, Emory's snake, gray rat snake, mouse snake, prairie rat snake, spotted mouse snake, Texas rat snake, and western pilot snake.

Description
The Great Plains rat snake is typically light gray or tan in color, with dark gray, brown, or green-gray blotching down its back, and stripes on either side of the head which meet to form a point between the eyes.

Habitat and behavior
The Great Plains rat snake prefers open grassland or lightly forested habitats, but is also found on coastal plains, semi-arid regions, as well as rocky, moderately mountainous regions. It can often be found on farmland, which often leads to its being erroneously called a chicken snake, and other areas with a relatively high rodent population, which is its primary diet. It will also eat birds, and occasionally snakes, lizards and frogs, all of which it subdues by constriction. It is primarily nocturnal, and oviparous, laying clutches of as many as 25 eggs in the late spring. Like most rat snakes, when agitated, the Great Plains rat snake will shake its tail vigorously, which by itself makes no noise, but when it shakes among dry leaf litter, it can sound remarkably like a rattlesnake, and often leads to misidentification. The Great Plains rat snake tends to remain still for a majority of its time awake, which is odd for a nocturnal being. The yellow-bellied racer (Coluber constrictor flaviventris), a snake that often lives in the same habitat, moves more often than the Great Plains rat snake, which could lead to a decline in the Great Plains rat snake's population as it is not as mobile.

Warning signs of agitation are curling up tightly and shaking its tail rapidly. Though P. emoryi has very small teeth and is nonvenomous, it will bite. However, as a whole, this species of snake is very calm and non-aggressive.

Taxonomy
This species, Pantherophis emoryi,  has undergone extensive reclassification since it was first described by Spencer Fullerton Baird and Charles Frédéric Girard in 1853 as Scotophis emoryi. It has often been placed in the genus Elaphe, but phylogenetic analyses performed in the 2000s have resulted in its transfer to Pantherophis.

P. emoryi has been elevated to full species status and downgraded to a subspecies of P. guttatus multiple times. Most recently, Burbrink suggested that P. guttatus be split into three species: P. guttatus, P. emoryi, and P. slowinskii.

The most recent taxonomic paper on this species complex refutes Burbrink's species suggestions based on more comprehensive sampling and genetic work. "Our data support a revision of the taxonomy of this group, and we recognize two species within the complex and three subspecies within P. emoryi. This study illustrates the importance of thorough sampling of contact zones and consideration of gene flow when delimiting species in widespread complexes containing parapatric lineages."

References

Further reading
Baird SF, Girard CF (1853). Catalogue of North American Reptiles in the Museum of the Smithsonian Institution. Part I.—Serpents. Washington, District of Columbia: Smithsonian Institution. xvi + 172 pp. (Scotophis emoryi, new species, pp. 157–158).
Behler JL, King FW (1979). The Audubon Society Field Guide to North American Retiles and Amphibians. New York: Alfred A. Knopf. 743 pp. . (Elaphe guttata emoryi, p. 605).
Conant R (1975). A Field Guide to Reptiles and Amphibians of Eastern and Central North America, Second Edition. Boston: Houghton Mifflin. xviii + 429 pp. + Plates 1-48.  (hardcover),  (paperback). (Elaphe guttata emoryi, pp. 191–192, Figures 43-44 + Pl 28 + Map 150).
Powell R, Conant R, Collins JT (2016). Peterson Field Guide to Reptiles and Amphibians of Eastern and Central North America, Fourth Edition. Boston and New York: Houghton Mifflin Harcourt. xiv + 494 pp., 47 color plates, 207 figures. . (Pantherophis emoryi, p. 387 + Plate 36 + Figures 161, 180).
Smith HM, Brodie ED Jr (1982). Reptiles of North America: A Guide to Field Identification. New York: Golden Press. 240 pp. . (Elaphe guttata emoryi, pp. 184–185).

External links

Rat Snakes of North America: Great Plains Rat Snake
Utah's Hogle Zoo: The Great Plains Rat Snake
Great Plains Rat Snake in captivity
Herps of Texas: Elaphe emoryi

Colubrids
Snakes of North America
Reptiles of the United States
Reptiles of Mexico
Fauna of the Great Plains
Fauna of the Plains-Midwest (United States)
Reptiles described in 1853
Taxa named by Spencer Fullerton Baird
Taxa named by Charles Frédéric Girard